Shippensburg is a borough in Cumberland and Franklin counties in the U.S. Commonwealth of Pennsylvania. The population was 5,478 at the 2020 census. 

Shippensburg was incorporated as a borough on January 21, 1819. In the past, there were furniture factories, engine and pump works, and other industrial works located within the town. Shippensburg is the home of the Beistle Company, the oldest manufacturer of decorations and party goods in the U.S.  In May 2012, Volvo Construction Equipment began a $100 million expansion project to bring its American headquarters to Shippensburg.

Shippensburg University of Pennsylvania, one of 14 universities of the Pennsylvania State System of Higher Education, is located just north of the borough limits in Shippensburg Township.

History
Shippensburg is the oldest community of the Cumberland Valley, and the second oldest west of the Susquehanna River in Pennsylvania (after York to the east). In July 1730, 12 Scots-Irish families came to the site of the present-day Shippensburg and built cabin homes along Burd's Run. Shippensburg began as the western outpost of colonial settlement.

The village received its name from Edward Shippen, a prominent resident of Lancaster (and onetime mayor of Philadelphia) who obtained the patent to the land from the heirs of William Penn. Edward Shippen's granddaughter, Peggy Shippen, was historically notable as the wife of General Benedict Arnold, who betrayed the Continental Army by defecting to the British during the American Revolutionary War.

In 1735, Samuel Perry built the Widow Piper's Tavern, which stands at the southwest corner of East King Street and Queen Street. This building was selected as the place for the first Cumberland County Courts in 1750 and 1751. The building has been restored and serves today as the home of the Shippensburg Civic Club.

On July 9, 1755, Edward Morris, the governor of Shippensburg, ordered that a fort be built after he learned of General Braddock's defeat at the hands of the French and Indians. His intent was to provide protection for the troops and colonists during the French and Indian War. Over the next year, several buildings, a  well, and a log palisade were built. Fort Morris was garrisoned until the early 1760s but preserved for several more years due to the efforts of Edward Shippen. There is also a record that an officer and eighteen provincial troops were stationed in Shippensburg during the winter of 1763-1764. On March 24, 1761, Shippen wrote, "I desire everybody in Shippensburg to take care of ye Fort for I will suffer a log of it to be thrown down on any pretense whatever."

Shippensburg University of Pennsylvania was founded in 1871 as a normal school.

In 2009, a team of archaeologists reported they had discovered the site of Fort Morris on Burd Street. Among the artifacts found were pottery, coins, buttons, musket balls, flints and musket parts. Some of these artifacts are housed in Shearer Hall on the Shippensburg University campus, while others are currently on display at the Shippensburg Historical Society.

The Shippensburg Historic District, Dykeman's Spring, the Benjamin Blythe Homestead, Cumberland Valley State Normal School Historic District, the Shippen House, and Widow Piper's Tavern are listed on the National Register of Historic Places.

Geography
Shippensburg is located in south-central Pennsylvania at  (40.049453, -77.523830), primarily in Cumberland County, but extending west into Franklin County.

U.S. Route 11 passes through the center of town as King Street; US 11 leads northeast  to Carlisle, the Cumberland County seat, and southwest  to Chambersburg, the Franklin County seat. Pennsylvania Route 696 leads north out of Shippensburg as Earl Street and south as Fayette Street. Pennsylvania Route 533 leads west out of town as Morris Street,  to Orrstown.

Gum Run flows through the center of town, entering from the south and becoming Middle Spring Creek, a northward-flowing tributary of Conodoguinet Creek and part of the Susquehanna River watershed. Outside the town, the area consists of mostly field and pasture, some forest, few streams and water holes.

Climate

Demographics

As of the census of 2000, there were 5,586 people, 2,397 households, and 1,138 families residing in the borough. The population density was 2,772.0 people per square mile (1,067.7/km²). There were 2,602 housing units at an average density of 1,291.2 per square mile (497.3/km²). The racial makeup of the borough was 94.16% White, 3.44% African American, 0.11% Native American, 0.98% Asian, 0.02% Pacific Islander, 0.47% from other races, and 0.82% from two or more races. Hispanic or Latino of any race were 1.15% of the population.

There were 2,397 households, out of which 20.9% had children under the age of 18 living with them, 34.5% were married couples living together, 9.9% had a female householder with no husband present, and 52.5% were non-families. 33.4% of all households were made up of individuals, and 15.1% had someone living alone who was 65 years of age or older. The average household size was 2.32 and the average family size was 2.87.

In the borough the population was spread out, with 17.6% under the age of 18, 28.5% from 18 to 24, 21.8% from 25 to 44, 16.4% from 45 to 64, and 15.6% who were 65 years of age or older. The median age was 28 years. For every 100 females, there were 85.3 males. For every 100 females age 18 and over, there were 82.5 males.

The median income for a household in the borough was $27,660, and the median income for a family was $39,896. Males had a median income of $29,387 versus $21,775 for females. The per capita income for the borough was $14,816. About 9.4% of families and 28.6% of the population were below the poverty line, including 19.6% of those under age 18 and 10.9% of those age 65 or over.

Festivals
Yearly, in the last full week of July, the Shippensburg Community Fair is held. Begun in 1958, the fair bills itself as Pennsylvania's largest bi-county fair. The fair includes agricultural exhibits, a craft show, food vendors, and carnival rides amongst other things.

Every summer on the last Saturday of August, Shippensburg holds the Corn Festival, an event that brings regional artisans and vendors to operate stands downtown. The downtown is closed to traffic for at least 5 blocks for most of the day.  Average attendance at the festival is estimated at 60,000 - 70,000 each year.  In 2021, the Corn Festival was held at the Shippensburg Fairgrounds.

Education
The town is served by the Shippensburg Area School District.

Notable people

sujatha baliga, Director of the Restorative Justice Project and MacArthur Fellow
Andy Enfield, current head basketball coach at the University of Southern California}
 John Hamilton, starred as Perry White on the Adventures of Superman TV series of the 1950s
 Thomas "Doc" Martin, historic physician of Taos, New Mexico
 William W. McCammon, Medal of Honor recipient from the American Civil War.
 Edward Shippen III, merchant, mayor of Philadelphia, founder of Shippensburg, Pennsylvania, founding member of Princeton University, and part of the Shippen Family. 
 Samuel D. Sturgis, Union Army general and namesake of Sturgis, South Dakota.

References

External links
 Shippensburg Borough official website
 Shippensburg Community Fair
 Shippensburg's Corn Festival
 SHAPE - Shippensburg Arts Programming & Education

Populated places established in 1730
Harrisburg–Carlisle metropolitan statistical area
Boroughs in Cumberland County, Pennsylvania
Boroughs in Franklin County, Pennsylvania
1730 establishments in Pennsylvania
Scotch-Irish American culture in Pennsylvania